

Diving

Men's events

Women's events

Swimming

Synchronized swimming

References

Commonwealth Games
1998 Commonwealth Games events
1998